is a Japanese footballer who plays as a defender. He currently play for Yokohama FC.

Career
Boniface joined first professional career to J2 club, Mito HollyHock in December 2017 after graduation at high school and university.

On 26 December 2020, Nduka joined to J2 club, Tokyo Verdy after 3 years stint at Mito HollyHock.

On 6 December 2022, Nduka announcement officially transfer to J1 newly promoted club, Yokohama FC for upcoming 2023 season after 2 years at Tokyo Verdy.

Personal life
Nduka was born in Koshigaya, Japan. Through to a Japanese mother and a Nigerian father. His younger brother is Charles Nduka, they currently play in J3 club, FC Gifu.

Career statistics

Club
.

References

External links

Profile at J. League
Profile at Mito HollyHock

1996 births
Living people
Nippon Sport Science University alumni
Association football people from Saitama Prefecture
Japanese people of Nigerian descent
Sportspeople of Nigerian descent
Japanese footballers
J1 League players
J2 League players
Mito HollyHock players
Tokyo Verdy players
Yokohama FC players
Association football defenders